Stephane Jamoye (born October 5, 1989) is a Belgian professional boxer who held the European bantamweight title from 2012 to 2013. He also challenged for the WBC bantamweight title and WBA (Regular) super bantamweight title in 2014.

Amateur career
Jamoye started boxing at the age of 14, and was a national champion by 16. Overall, Jamoye compiled a 56-4 record in the amateur ranks.

Professional career
Jamoye turned pro 20 days after his 18th birthday. After an impressive 12-0 start to his career, he received a shot at the WBC Youth World bantamweight title. He defeated fellow undefeated fighter Pungluang Sor Singyu on May 9, 2009 by split decision for the belt.

After five straight wins, Jamoye lost the title to another 19-year-old, Tomoki Kameda, via a controversial split decision on August 28, 2010 in Mazatlán. The fight was initially declared a draw, but the victory was then awarded to Kameda after a judge found an error on his scorecard. The WBC ordered a rematch to resolve the issue, but Kameda refused. It was also his first fight outside of Europe.

Jamoye fought Jamie McDonnell on January 22, 2011 in Doncaster, England for his EBU bantamweight belt, but lost the entertaining fight by majority decision. After a win by TKO over Tanzanian boxer Anthony Mathias, Jamoye fought American Léo Santa Cruz in Xalapa, Mexico on March 26, 2011. The fast-paced battle ended in the sixth round, when Santa Cruz hit Jamoye with a right hook to the body. The fight was also for the interim WBC Youth World bantamweight title.

Three consecutive wins later, he faced Lee Haskins on December 14, 2012 for the EBU bantamweight title. Jamoye was knocked down in the second round, but responded by opening a cut above Haskins' right eye in the third. Cheered on by his hometown crowd, he sent Haskins to the canvas with an array of punches in the sixth. Haskins then went down three times in the eighth, each the result of a brutal body shot. The referee finally stopped the bout in the Belgian fighter's favor after the third time. The commentators called it a "late candidate for fight of the year."

Jamoye retained against Ashley Sexton three months later in Herstal with another eighth-round TKO. Now ranked as the #1 bantamweight by the WBC, Jamoye was shocked by Frenchman Karim Guerfi by majority decision on September 28, 2013 for the title. Guerfi had lost three of his previous four fights.

His next fight was against Shinsuke Yamanaka for his WBC World bantamweight title. Jamoye went down four times before the bout was stopped in the ninth round. After a first-round TKO against Hungarian journeyman Richard Voros, Jamoye faced Scott Quigg in Manchester on September 13, 2014 for his WBA World super bantamweight title. Quigg's original opponent, Paulus Ambunda, pulled out with a hamstring injury. During the fight, Quigg hit Jamoye with a devastating body blow in the third round to end the lopsided bout and retain his title.

Professional boxing record

| style="text-align:center;" colspan="8"|32 Wins (17 knockouts, 15 decisions), 8 Losses, 0 Draws
|-  style="text-align:center; background:#e3e3e3;"
|  style="border-style:none none solid solid; "|Res.
|  style="border-style:none none solid solid; "|Record
|  style="border-style:none none solid solid; "|Opponent
|  style="border-style:none none solid solid; "|Type
|  style="border-style:none none solid solid; "|Rd., Time
|  style="border-style:none none solid solid; "|Date
|  style="border-style:none none solid solid; "|Location
|  style="border-style:none none solid solid; "|Notes
|- align=center
|Loss
|align=center|32–8||align=left| Karim Guerfi
|
|
|
|align=left|
|align=left|
|- align=center

|Win
|align=center|32–7||align=left| Zsolt Sarkozi
|
|
|
|align=left|
|align=left|
|- align=center
|Win
|align=center|31–7||align=left| Lesther Cantillano
|
|
|
|align=left|
|align=left|
|- align=center
|Win
|align=center|30–7||align=left| Edwin Tellez
|
|
|
|align=left|
|align=left|
|- align=center
|Win
|align=center|29–7||align=left| Edwin Tellez
|
|
|
|align=left|
|align=left|
|- align=center
|Loss
|align=center|28–7||align=left| Ryan Farrag
|
|
|
|align=left|
|align=left|
|- align=center
|Win
|align=center|28–6||align=left| Reynaldo Cajina
|
|
|
|align=left|
|align=left|
|- align=center
|Win
|align=center|27–6||align=left| Jorge Luis Munguia
|
|
|
|align=left|
|align=left|
|- align=center
|Loss
|align=center|26–6||align=left| Scott Quigg
|
|
|
|align=left|
|align=left|
|- align=center
|Win
|align=center|26–5||align=left| Richard Voros
|
|
|
|align=left|
|align=left|
|- align=center
|Loss
|align=center|25–5||align=left| Shinsuke Yamanaka
|
|
|
|align=left|
|align=left|
|- align=center
|Loss
|align=center|25–4||align=left| Karim Guerfi
|
|
|
|align=left|
|align=left|
|- align=center
|Win
|align=center|25–3||align=left| Ashley Sexton
|
|
|
|align=left|
|align=left|
|- align=center
|Win
|align=center|24–3||align=left| Lee Haskins
|
|
|
|align=left|
|align=left|
|- align=center
|Win
|align=center|23-3||align=left| Miguel Aguilar
|
|
|
|align=left|
|align=left|
|- align=center
|Win
|align=center|22–3||align=left| Julio Buitrago
|
|
|
|align=left|
|align=left|
|- align=center
|Win
|align=center|21–3||align=left| Luis Singo
|
|
|
|align=left|
|align=left|
|- align=center
|Loss
|align=center|20–3||align=left| Léo Santa Cruz
|
|
|
|align=left|
|align=left|
|- align=center
|Win
|align=center|20–2||align=left| Anthony Mathias
|
|
|
|align=left|
|align=left|
|- align=center
|Loss
|align=center|19–2||align=left| Jamie McDonnell
|
|
|
|align=left|
|align=left|
|- align=center
|Win
|align=center|19–1||align=left| Giovanni Jaramillo
|
|
|
|align=left|
|align=left|
|- align=center
|Loss
|align=center|18–1||align=left| Tomoki Kameda
|
|
|
|align=left|
|align=left|
|- align=center
|Win
|align=center|18–0||align=left| Peter Baláž
|
|
|
|align=left|
|align=left|
|- align=center
|Win
|align=center|17–0||align=left| Franck Gorjux
|
|
|
|align=left|
|align=left|
|- align=center
|Win
|align=center|16–0||align=left| Hamis Ajali
|
|
|
|align=left|
|align=left|
|- align=center
|Win
|align=center|15–0||align=left| Mohamed Bouleghcha
|
|
|
|align=left|
|align=left|
|- align=center
|Win
|align=center|14–0||align=left| Cedric Cambier
|
|
|
|align=left|
|align=left|
|- align=center
|Win
|align=center|13–0||align=left| Pungluang Sor Singyu
|
|
|
|align=left|
|align=left|
|- align=center
|Win
|align=center|12–0||align=left| Mohamed Nouari
|
|
|
|align=left|
|align=left|
|- align=center
|Win
|align=center|11–0||align=left| Eilon Kedem
|
|
|
|align=left|
|align=left|
|- align=center
|Win
|align=center|10–0||align=left| Aurelien Lecoq
|
|
|
|align=left|
|align=left|
|- align=center
|Win
|align=center|9–0||align=left| Ladislav Nemeth
|
|
|
|align=left|
|align=left|
|- align=center
|Win
|align=center|8–0||align=left| Ladislav Nemeth
|
|
|
|align=left|
|align=left|
|- align=center
|Win
|align=center|7–0||align=left| Robert Csicso
|
|
|
|align=left|
|align=left|
|- align=center
|Win
|align=center|6–0||align=left| Andrzej Ziora
|
|
|
|align=left|
|align=left|
|- align=center
|Win
|align=center|5–0||align=left| Aurelien Lecoq
|
|
|
|align=left|
|align=left|
|- align=center
|Win
|align=center|4–0||align=left| Elemir Rafael
|
|
|
|align=left|
|align=left|
|- align=center
|Win
|align=center|3–0||align=left| Aurelien Lecoq
|
|
|
|align=left|
|align=left|
|- align=center
|Win
|align=center|2–0||align=left| Cristian Niculae
|
|
|
|align=left|
|align=left|
|- align=center
|Win
|align=center|1–0|| align=left| Robert Zsemberi
|
|||
|align=left|
|

Personal life
Jamoye's younger brother, Steve, is also a professional boxer out of Belgium. As of October 2015, his record is 17-1-1. He is a former  WBC Youth Silver and Belgium super lightweight champion.

References

External links
 

1989 births
Living people
Belgian male boxers
Super-flyweight boxers
Bantamweight boxers
Super-bantamweight boxers
European Boxing Union champions
People from Visé
Sportspeople from Liège Province